Betty Burgess (February 15, 1917 – 2002) was a singer, dancer, and actress in the United States. She married Duncan Laing in 1951 and then George Zaharias in January 1960. She co-starred in the 1935 film Coronado and the 1938 film I Demand Payment.

She worked for Paramount as a promising young star. She performed with Sonny Lamont.

The UCLA Library has a 1935 photo of 18 year old Burgess shaking hands with fellow actress 15 year old Olympe Bradna.

Filmography
Pirate Party on Catalina Isle, a 2-reel short
Coronado (1935)
Tough to Handle (1937)
I Demand Payment (1938)
The Adventures of the Masked Phantom (1939), a "campy" Western themed musical

References

1917 births

2002 deaths
American actresses
American female dancers
American women singers